Mrs. Einstein is a Dutch all-female vocal group. The group is most notable for representing the Netherlands in the Eurovision Song Contest 1997 held in Dublin, Ireland with the song "Niemand heeft nog tijd".

History 
Mrs. Einstein was founded in 1990 by De Meisjes (1987–90) members Saskia van Zutphen, Paulette Willemse and Suzanne Venneker. The group usually performs in theatres, covering songs from all over the world in a different genre or with translated lyrics.

In 1997, Mrs. Einstein was internally selected to represent the Netherlands in the Eurovision Song Contest. Their entry, "Niemand heeft nog tijd", was chosen through the national final Nationaal Songfestival 1997. In Dublin, the group received a total of 5 points, finishing in 22nd place out of 25 participants.

Members

Discography

Albums

Singles

References 

All-female bands
Dutch girl groups
Eurovision Song Contest entrants for the Netherlands
Eurovision Song Contest entrants of 1997
Musical groups established in 1990
Columbia Records artists